Jang Chyi-lu (born 28 March 1968) is a Taiwanese politician and former scholar of public administration.

Jang, a Taoyuan native, was born on 28 March 1968 and attended the Taiwan Provincial Chung Hsing University, earning his bachelor's and master's degrees in public administration before pursuing doctoral study at the Sol Price School of Public Policy at the University of Southern California. Jang was the dean of the College of Social Sciences at National Sun Yat-sen University and a professor of political economy before contesting the 2020 Taiwanese legislative election.

Jang was ranked second on the proportional representation party list of the Taiwan People's Party following an open audition. During the campaign, he helped present the TPP's political positions in debates. Jang secured a seat on the Legislative Yuan after the Taiwan People's Party won over 11% of the party list vote on 11 January 2020.

References

Living people
Members of the 10th Legislative Yuan
Taiwan People's Party Members of the Legislative Yuan
Taiwanese university and college faculty deans
Academic staff of the National Sun Yat-sen University
Political economists
21st-century Taiwanese economists
20th-century Taiwanese economists
Party List Members of the Legislative Yuan
1968 births
National Taipei University alumni
USC Sol Price School of Public Policy alumni
Taiwanese expatriates in the United States
Public administration scholars